John Jones (1856 - 25 April 1899) was a Welsh amateur footballer who spent most of his football career with Druids, and played for the Wales national football team in their first international match in 1876.

Football career
Jones worked as a coal-miner at Gwersyllt, near Wrexham and joined the Druids club, based in his home town of Ruabon, in 1875.

In February 1876, he took part in trials organized by Llewelyn Kenrick (one of the founders of the Druids club) to select Welsh players to represent their country in a match against Scotland. The match was  played at Hamilton Crescent, Partick, the home of the West of Scotland Cricket Club on 25 March 1876, with Jones playing on the left wing. The Welsh were well defeated, conceding four goals without reply.

Jones was known throughout North Wales football circles as "Dirty Jack"; this was not in reference to his occupation but to his style of football. In common with many players of the 1880s, he was a "tough and vigorous opponent who gave no quarter".

Druids reached the final of the inaugural Welsh Cup on 30 March 1878, losing 1–0 to local rivals Wrexham.

In 1878, the Druids disbanded temporarily following the loss of their ground at Plasmadoc, with Jones spending a season playing for Oswestry. By 1879, he was back with Druids with the club again reaching the Welsh Cup final, defeating Ruthin 2–1, with Jones scoring the Druids second goal.

Druids were victorious in the Welsh Cup in the next two seasons, defeating Newtown White Star 2–0 in 1881 and Northwich Victoria 5–0 in 1882.

Druids again reached the final in 1883, losing 1–0 to Wrexham. Jones did not feature in the 1884 final, but returned in 1885, now playing in goal as Druids defeated Oswestry White Stars 3–1 in a replay.

After Football
Jones lived on Bridge Street, Ruabon and worked for many years as the chief clerk at the Great Western Railway Station.

Death
John Jones died from side effects of typhoid on 25 April 1899.

Honours
Druids
Welsh Cup
Winners: 1880, 1881, 1882 & 1885
Finalists: 1878 & 1883

References

External links
Article on North Wales coal-mines, including Gwersyllt

1856 births
People from Ruabon
Sportspeople from Wrexham County Borough
Year of death missing
Welsh footballers
Druids F.C. players
Oswestry Town F.C. players
Wales international footballers
Association football forwards
Association football goalkeepers